Yemen is an Islamic society. Nearly all Yemenis are Muslims, with approximately 65% belonging to the Sunni Islam and approximately 35% belonging to the Zaydi Shia school of thought. Amongst the native population, there are approximately 1,000 Christians, and 6 remaining Jews.  However, Pew-Templeton estimates the number of Christians to be as high as 40,000, though most do not publicly identify as such, due to fears of religious persecution. According to WIN/Gallup International polls, Yemen has the most religious population among Arab countries and it is one of the most religious populations world-wide.

Religious minorities

Jews are the oldest Abrahamic religious minority. Nearly all of the country's once-sizable Jewish population has emigrated. As of 2008, fewer than 400 Jews remained in the northern part of the country, primarily in Amran Governorate. Since January 2007, the historic Saada governorate community of 45 Jews have lived in Sana'a, under the protection and care of the Government, after abandoning their homes in the face of threats from al-Houthi rebels. The community has abandoned its synagogues in Saada. As of 2008, there was at least one functioning synagogue in Amran Governorate. As of 2014, fewer than 200 Jews remain in Yemen.

There are 3,000 Christians throughout the country, most of whom are refugees or temporary foreign residents. There are four churches in Aden, three Roman Catholic and one Anglican. Ethiopian Orthodox Tewahedo Church services also take place weekly in Sana'a, Aden, and other cities.

Among religious minorities, approximately 1,000 Christians and most Jews actively participated in some form of formal religious service or ritual, although not always in a public place of worship. Pew-Templeton estimates the number of Christians in Yemen at 40,000, most of whom are not openly Christian, due to persecution of religious minorities.

Missionary services
Christian missionaries and nongovernmental organizations (NGOs) affiliated with missionary groups operate in the country; most restrict their activities to the provision of medical services; others were employed in teaching and social services. Invited by the Government, the Sisters of Charity run homes for the poor and persons with disabilities in Sana'a, Taiz, Hodeida, and Aden. A Swedish mission organization runs a technical school for the disabled and poor in Taiz. There was also a medical mission in Saada, but in January 2007, the mission reportedly fled to escape the fighting. It is believed that they remained in the region to provide medical assistance to victims of the violence. Another mission operated two charitable clinics in Aden.

In spite of the lack of freedom of religion in Yemen, a 2015 global census estimates some 400 Christians from a Muslim background, though not all of these individuals are necessarily Yemeni citizens.

Freedom of religion

The Constitution of Yemen provides for freedom of religion, and the Government generally respected this right in practice. The Constitution declares that Islam is the state religion, and that Shari'a (Islamic law) is the source of all legislation. Muslims and followers of religious groups other than Islam are free to worship according to their beliefs, but the Government prohibits conversion from Islam and the proselytization of Muslims. Although relations among religious groups continued to contribute to religious freedom, there were some reports of societal abuses and discrimination based on religious belief or practice, particularly as related to the Jewish community in Amran Governorate and Zaydi Muslims. Jewish residents of Amran Governorate reportedly experienced increased harassment by a small group of their Muslim neighbors. Some prominent Zaydi Muslims reported they felt targeted by government entities for their religious affiliation. The continued, unresolved situation in Saada Governorate and increasing violence between government forces and rebels associated with the al-Houthi family, who adhere to the Zaydi school of Shia Islam, has caused political, tribal, and religious tensions.

Public schools provide instruction in Islam but not in other religions, although Muslim citizens are allowed to attend private schools that do not teach Islam. In an effort to curb ideological and religious extremism in schools, the government does not permit any courses outside of the officially approved curriculum to be taught in private and national schools. Because the government is concerned that unlicensed religious schools deviate from formal educational requirements and promote militant ideology, it has closed more than 4,500 institutions of this type, and deported foreign students studying there.

See also
Islam in Yemen
Christianity in Yemen
Yemenite Jews
Shia Islam in Yemen

References